Gauruncus ischyros is a species of moth of the family Tortricidae. It is found in Pichincha Province, Ecuador.

The wingspan is 16–17 mm. The ground colour of the forewings is creamish, tinged with brown grey and with ferruginous suffusions and brown spots. The hindwings are brownish cream.

Etymology
The species name refers to the heavily sclerotized, large parts of the moth’s anatomy and is derived from Greek ischyros (meaning strong).

References

Moths described in 2013
Euliini